Trubyatchinskiy Nunatak is a nunatak lying 7 nautical miles (13 km) south of Alderdice Peak in the Nye Mountains, Enderby Land. Named by the Soviet Antarctic Expedition, 1961–62, for Soviet magnetician N.N. Trubyatchinskiy (1886–1942).

Nunataks of Enderby Land